This page lists the episodes of the 1999–2001 television comedy-drama Popular. There were a total of 43 episodes in this series.

Series overview

Episodes

Season 1 (1999–2000)

Season 2 (2000–2001)

References

Popular
Lists of American teen drama television series episodes